Horace Adolphus Taylor, a.k.a. Hod Taylor (May 24, 1837 – August 5, 1910), was a member of the Wisconsin State Senate and Chairman of the Republican Party of Wisconsin.

Biography
Taylor was born in Norfolk, New York on May 24, 1837. He moved to River Falls, Wisconsin in 1855. He founded the River Falls Journal with his brother Lute Taylor in 1857. In 1860, he moved to Hudson, Wisconsin, where he purchased the Hudson Chronicle. Taylor later moved again to Madison, Wisconsin in 1890, where he purchased and edited the Wisconsin State Journal until 1901. He died on August 5, 1910 at his home in Washington, D.C.

Political career
Taylor was a delegate to the Republican National Convention in 1876 and 1884 and was Chairman of the Republican Party of Wisconsin from 1883 to 1887. From 1881 to 1883, he had been U.S. Consul in Marseille, France. Taylor served in the State Senate in 1889. In the same year, he was appointed United States Assistant Secretary of the Treasury and remained in the position until 1906. He unsuccessfully campaigned for governor of Wisconsin in 1888 and 1896.

References

People from Norfolk, New York
People from River Falls, Wisconsin
People from Hudson, Wisconsin
Politicians from Madison, Wisconsin
Wisconsin state senators
Republican Party of Wisconsin chairs
American consuls
United States Assistant Secretaries of the Treasury
Editors of Wisconsin newspapers
19th-century American newspaper editors
20th-century American newspaper editors
1837 births
1910 deaths
19th-century American politicians